Gosport and Fareham was a parliamentary constituency in Hampshire which returned one Member of Parliament (MP)  to the House of Commons of the Parliament of the United Kingdom from 1950 until it was abolished for the February 1974 general election.

It was then replaced by two new constituencies, Gosport and Fareham. The incumbent MP, Reginald Bennett, was re-elected in the new Fareham constituency.

Boundaries 
The Borough of Gosport, and the Urban District of Fareham.

Members of Parliament

Election results

Elections in the 1950s

Elections in the 1960s

Elections in the 1970s

References 

Parliamentary constituencies in Hampshire (historic)
Constituencies of the Parliament of the United Kingdom established in 1950
Constituencies of the Parliament of the United Kingdom disestablished in 1974
Fareham
Politics of Gosport